Podlasek  is a settlement in the administrative district of Gmina Grajewo, within Grajewo County, Podlaskie Voivodeship, in north-eastern Poland.

History
During World War II, the settlement was occupied by the Soviet Union from 1939 to 1941, and by Nazi Germany from 1941 to 1944. In 1943, the Germans established a forced labour camp in the village. Around 2,300 men from the region passed through the camp until its dissolution in July 1944.

Transport
There is a train station in the village.

References

Podlasek